Stuttering (alalia syllabaris), also known as stammering (alalia literalis or anarthria literalis), is a speech disorder in which the flow of speech is disrupted by involuntary repetitions and prolongations of sounds, syllables, words or phrases, and involuntary silent pauses or blocks during which the person who stutters is unable to produce sounds. The exact etiology of stuttering is unknown; both genetics and neurophysiology are thought to contribute. There are many treatments and speech-language pathology techniques available that may help increase fluency in some people who stutter to the point where an untrained ear cannot identify a problem; however, there is essentially no cure for the disorder at present.

People who stutter include British Prime Minister Winston Churchill, orator Demosthenes, King George VI, actor James Earl Jones, US President Joe Biden, and country singer Mel Tillis. Churchill, whose stutter was particularly apparent to 1920s writers, was one of the 30% of people who stutter who have an associated speech disorder—a lisp in his case—yet led his nation through World War II. Demosthenes stammered and was inarticulate as a youth, yet, through dedicated practice, using methods such as placing pebbles in his mouth, became a great orator of Ancient Greece. King George VI hired speech therapist Lionel Logue to enable him to speak to his Empire, and Logue effectively helped him accomplish this goal. This training and its results are the focus of the 2010 film The King's Speech. James Earl Jones has stated he was mute for many years of his youth yet he became an actor noted for the power of his voice. Mel Tillis stutters when talking but not when singing. Many people had their speech impairment only as a child and have overcome their condition.

Actors

Athletes

Politicians

Singers and musicians

Writers

Others

References

Mental disorders diagnosed in childhood
Human voice
Lists of people with disabilities